Neptis comorarum is a butterfly in the family Nymphalidae. It is found on the Comoros.

Subspecies
Neptis comorarum comorarum (Comoros: Grand Comore, Anjouan)
Neptis comorarum legrandi Turlin, 1994 (Comoros)

References

Butterflies described in 1890
comorarum
Endemic fauna of the Comoros